Trinity Protestant Episcopal Church may refer to:

Trinity Protestant Episcopal Church (Galveston, Texas), listed on the National Register of Historic Places in Galveston County, Texas
Trinity Protestant Episcopal Church (Parkersburg, West Virginia), listed on the National Register of Historic Places in Wood County, West Virginia

See also
Trinity Episcopal Church (disambiguation)